Wachusett Regional School District was founded in 1955 and comprises the Massachusetts towns of Holden, Paxton, Princeton, Rutland, and Sterling. The district's central office is located in the Old Jefferson Elementary School in Jefferson, Massachusetts.

Leadership
The district is led by Superintendent Darryll McCall and Deputy Superintendent Robert Berlo.

Schools 
The district consists of 13 schools: one regional high school, three middle schools, six elementary schools, two K-8 schools and one early childhood center.

High school
Wachusett Regional High School

Middle schools
Central Tree Middle School
Chocksett Middle School
Mountview Middle School

Elementary schools
Davis Hill Elementary School
Dawson Elementary School
Glenwood Elementary School
Houghton Elementary School
Mayo Elementary School
Naquaq Elementary School

K-8 schools
Paxton Center School
Thomas Prince School

Early childhood education
Early Childhood Center

References

External links
 Wachusett Regional High School website
 Wachusett Regional School District website

 
School districts in Massachusetts
Holden, Massachusetts
Princeton, Massachusetts
1955 establishments in Massachusetts
School districts established in 1955